Sarnath Express is an express train belonging to North Eastern Railway connecting  with .

Overview 

Rakes
The service has one First A/C (HA1), two Second A/C (2A), eight Third A/C (3A) and 05 Sleeper Class (LS) of Couchette car type in addition to five General Class (UR/GS) of Corridor coach type and two Seating–Luggage rakes (SLR). During 16 March 2017, it was announced by North Eastern Railway zone that an additional Third A/C coach will be added to the existing for a period of three months from 19 March 2017–19 June 2017 for both up and down services.

{| class="wikitable plainrowheaders unsortable" style="text-align:center"
|-
! scope="col" style="background:lightskyblue;"| Loco
! scope="col" style="background:lightskyblue;"| 1
! scope="col" style="background:lightskyblue;"| 2
! scope="col" style="background:lightskyblue;"| 3
! scope="col" style="background:lightskyblue;"| 4
! scope="col" style="background:lightskyblue;"| 5
! scope="col" style="background:lightskyblue;"| 6
! scope="col" style="background:lightskyblue;"| 7
! scope="col" style="background:lightskyblue;"| 8
! scope="col" style="background:lightskyblue;"| 9
! scope="col" style="background:lightskyblue;"| 10
! scope="col" style="background:lightskyblue;"| 11
! scope="col" style="background:lightskyblue;"| 12
! scope="col" style="background:lightskyblue;"| 13
! scope="col" style="background:lightskyblue;"| 14
! scope="col" style="background:lightskyblue;"| 15
! scope="col" style="background:lightskyblue;"| 16
! scope="col" style="background:lightskyblue;"| 17
! scope="col" style="background:lightskyblue;"| 18
! scope="col" style="background:lightskyblue;"| 19
! scope="col" style="background:lightskyblue;"| 20
! scope="col" style="background:lightskyblue;"| 21
|-
| || EOG|| GEN|| GEN|| HA1|| A1||A2|| B6|| B5|| B4|| B3|| B2|| B1|| S7|| S6|| S5|| S4|| S3|| S2|| S1|| GEN|| EOG||
2

Route

Notes

References

Transport in Chhapra
Transport in Durg
Named passenger trains of India
Rail transport in Bihar
Rail transport in Uttar Pradesh
Rail transport in Madhya Pradesh
Rail transport in Chhattisgarh
Express trains in India